This page is a list of species of the order Lagomorpha discovered in the 2000s. See also parent page Mammals discovered in the 2000s.

Black pika Ochotona nigritia (2000)
The black pika is a new species of pika.

Venezuelan lowland rabbit Sylvilagus varynaensis (2000)
The Venezuelan lowland rabbit is a new species of cottontail rabbit described in 2000, and named Sylvilagus varynaensis. It is the largest and darkest of the Venezuelan rabbits.

Annamite striped rabbit Nesolagus timminsi (late 90s/2000)
The Annamite striped rabbit Nesolagus timminsi was discovered in the mountain forests in Vietnam and Laos. Its existence was first made known as food for sale on a market stall. It is a member of a genus previously only known from the Sumatran striped rabbit (N. netscheri''). Since its discovery, the Annamite striped rabbit has been found in many locations throughout Vietnam.

References

Lagomorphs